Lauritsala Church is an Evangelical Lutheran church in the Lauritsala district of Lappeenranta, Finland. The church was opened in December 1969. The modernist concrete design was created by architect  and architect student . The basis of the design is an equilateral triangle symbolising the Holy Trinity.

The church and the adjacent parish center are listed as a nationally significant built heritage site by the Finnish National Board of Antiquities.

See also
 St. Mary's Church of Lappee

References

External links
 Official site (in Finnish)

Lauritsala
Lutheran churches in Finland
Modernist architecture in Finland
Churches completed in 1969